German submarine U-804 was a Type IXC/40 U-boat of Nazi Germany's Kriegsmarine during World War II. U-804 was ordered on 7 December 1940, and was laid down on 1 December 1942 at Deutsche Schiff- und Maschinenbau AG Seebeckwerft, Bremerhaven as yard number 362. She was launched on 1 April 1943 and commissioned under the command of Oberleutnant zur See der Reserve Herbert Meyer (Crew III/37) on 4 December of that year.

Design
German Type IXC/40 submarines were slightly larger than the original Type IXCs. U-804 had a displacement of  when at the surface and  while submerged. She had two shafts and two  propellers.

U-804 was fitted with six  torpedo tubes (four fitted at the bow and two at the stern), 22 torpedoes, one  SK C/32 naval gun, 180 rounds, and a  Flak M42 as well as two twin  C/30 anti-aircraft guns. The boat had a complement of forty-eight.

Service history

Training
U-804 began training exercises with the 4th U-boat Flotilla on 4 December 1943, and finished her sea trials on 30 June 1944. On 16 June 1944, U-804 was attacked by a Norwegian Mosquito aircraft from No. 333 Squadron RAF, but succeeded in shooting down its attacker at the cost of eight crew members wounded; only minor damage was inflicted on the submarine.

First patrol
U-804 began her first war patrol on 19 June 1944 (while still undergoing training) with the 10th U-boat Flotilla. She left Bergen and headed into the North Sea, passing north of the British Isles into the North Atlantic, where she remained for 116 days. Upon sighting the destroyers, the U-boat quickly dived, but the two escorts detected her on their sonar and began their attack approach. Suddenly, USS Fiske was torpedoed on her starboard side by U-804, and within 10 minutes, she broke in two. Amidst the confusion following the sinking of USS Fiske, U-804 slipped away and returned to her patrol.

Second patrol & loss
On 12 October 1944, U-804 returned to the port of Flensburg after 116 days at sea. Five days later she left Flensburg for Kiel, where she remained until 4 April 1945 before leaving for occupied Norway. While en route in company with another of the flotilla's boats, the two submarines were detected and attacked in the Skagerrak strait on 9 April 1945 by over 30 Mosquito aircraft from three Royal Air Force squadrons based at Banff. U-1065 succeeded in shooting down one of the attacking aircraft before being hit by several rockets fired by 10 Mosquitos from 143 and 235 Squadrons; she exploded and sank with the loss of her crew of 45 men.

Summary of raiding history

References

Notes

Citations

Bibliography

External links

U-boats commissioned in 1943
U-boats sunk in 1945
World War II submarines of Germany
1943 ships
U-boats sunk by British aircraft
Ships built in Bremen (state)
German Type IX submarines
Ships lost with all hands
World War II shipwrecks in the Kattegat
Maritime incidents in April 1945